Lake Humphreys is a reservoir located northeast of the city of Duncan, Oklahoma, United States. It was created in 1958 with an earthen dam. The lake is operated by the city of Duncan.

References

Humphreys
Geography of Stephens County, Oklahoma